Alex Ryan Kirk (born November 14, 1991) is an American professional basketball player for Alvark Tokyo of the Japanese B.League. He played college basketball for the University of New Mexico.

College career
Kirk, a 7'0" center, played at Los Alamos High School in Los Alamos, New Mexico.  He came to the University of New Mexico in 2010, averaging 4.7 points and 3.7 rebounds per game in the 2010–11 season.  In the offseason, Kirk underwent back surgery for a herniated disc and subsequently redshirted the 2011–12 season.  Kirk bounced back as a redshirt sophomore, averaging 12.1 points, 8.1 rebounds and 1.8 blocked shots per game.  At the conclusion of the season, Kirk was named second team All-Mountain West Conference and a member of the league's All-Defensive team.

In the summer of 2013, Kirk was named to the United States' team for the 2013 Summer Universiade. He averaged 3.7 points and 4.6 rebounds as the team finished in ninth place.

In 2013–14, Kirk increased his numbers to 13.2 points, 8.7 rebounds and 2.7 blocks per game.  He was named third team All-MWC and repeated as a member of the All-Defensive team.

In April 2014, Kirk declared for the NBA draft, foregoing his final year of college eligibility.

Professional career

Cleveland Cavaliers
After going undrafted in the 2014 NBA draft, Kirk joined the Cleveland Cavaliers for the 2014 NBA Summer League. On August 11, 2014, he signed with the Cavaliers. During his rookie season with the Cavaliers, he had multiple assignments with the Canton Charge of the NBA Development League.

On January 5, 2015, Kirk was traded to the New York Knicks in a three-team trade that also involved the Oklahoma City Thunder. Two days later, he was waived by the Knicks.

Canton Charge
On January 10, 2015, Kirk was acquired by the Canton Charge. In 46 games for the Charge in 2014–15, he averaged 12.5 points, 6.5 rebounds, 1.1 assists and 1.1 blocks per game.

Pistoia Basket 2000
On August 15, 2015, Kirk signed with Pistoia Basket 2000 of the Italian Serie A for the 2015–16 season. Kirk averaged 16.3 points and 7.6 rebounds per game for Pistoia, which reached the Serie A playoffs before being eliminated in the first round by Scandone Avellino.

Guangzhou Long-Lions
In July 2016, Kirk played for the San Antonio Spurs in the Utah session of the 2016 NBA Summer League. He then played for the Toronto Raptors in the Las Vegas session.

On July 29, 2016, Kirk signed to play for the Guangzhou Long-Lions of the Chinese Basketball Association for the 2016-17 season. On November 15, he was released by Guangzhou.

Anadolu Efes
On January 16, 2017, Kirk signed with Turkish club Anadolu Efes for the rest of the season.

Alvark Tokyo
On July 26, 2017, Kirk signed with Alvark Tokyo of the Japan B League.

Alvark Tokyo won the 2017-18 B League championship, and Kirk led the team, averaging 16.2 points and 8.8 rebounds per game for the season.

In the summer of 2017, Kirk played in The Basketball Tournament on ESPN for The Stickmen. He competed for the $2 million prize, and for The Stickmen, he averaged 6.5 points per game. Kirk helped take The Stickmen to the second round of the tournament, where they then lost to Team Challenge ALS 87–73.  In TBT 2018, he played for Eberlein Drive. Eberlein Drive made it to the championship game, where they lost to Overseas Elite.

NBA career statistics

Regular season

|-
| style="text-align:left;"| 
| style="text-align:left;"| Cleveland
| 5 || 0 || 2.8 || .250 || .000 || 1.000 || .2 || .2 || .0 || .0 || .8
|-   
| style="text-align:left;"| Career
| style="text-align:left;"| 
| 5 || 0 || 2.8 || .250 || .000 || 1.000 || .2 || .2 || .0 || .0 || .8

International career statistics

|-
| style="text-align:left;"| 2017-18
| style="text-align:left;"| A Tokyo
| 60 || 60 || 26.1 || .606 || .275 || .773 || 8.9 || .9 || .5 || 1.2||16.2
|-

References

External links
 
 New Mexico Lobos bio
 

1991 births
Living people
Alvark Tokyo players
American expatriate basketball people in China
American expatriate basketball people in Italy
American expatriate basketball people in Japan
American expatriate basketball people in Turkey
American men's basketball players
Anadolu Efes S.K. players
Basketball players from New Mexico
Canton Charge players
Centers (basketball)
Cleveland Cavaliers players
Guangzhou Loong Lions players
New Mexico Lobos men's basketball players
People from Los Alamos, New Mexico
Pistoia Basket 2000 players
Undrafted National Basketball Association players